Alexander Naumovich Tsfasman (born December 14, 1906 - died February 20, 1971) was a Soviet Jazz pianist, composer, conductor, arranger, publisher and activist. He was an important figure in Soviet Jazz from the period of the mid-1920s until the late 1960s.

Tsfasman was born in Alexandrovsk (now Zaporizhya, Ukraine) in the Russian empire, and graduated from the Nizhegorod Musical Technicum in 1923, where he played percussion in the orchestra, and graduated from the Moscow Conservatory in 1930 from the piano class of Felix Blumenfeld.

References 

Soviet composers
Soviet male composers
Soviet pianists
Ukrainian composers
Soviet conductors (music)
Jewish composers
Soviet Jews
1906 births
1971 deaths
20th-century pianists
20th-century composers
20th-century conductors (music)
20th-century Russian male musicians